Hobbseus yalobushensis, the Yalobusha Riverlet Crayfish, is a species of crayfish in the family Cambaridae. It is endemic to Mississippi.

References

External links

Cambaridae
Crustaceans described in 1989
Fauna of the United States
Freshwater crustaceans of North America
Endemic fauna of Mississippi